Louis Legrand (19th century) was a French photographer based in Shanghai who may have been commissioned to accompany French forces and photographically document their participation in the Anglo-French military expedition to northern China during the Second Opium War in 1860. No evidence has yet been found that Legrand actually joined the expedition or took photographs on it.

References
 Thiriez, Régine. Barbarian Lens: Western Photographers of the Qianlong Emperor's European Palaces (Amsterdam: Gordon and Breach, 1998), 6, 7.

19th-century births
19th-century deaths
19th-century French photographers
French expatriates in China
19th-century French people
Place of birth missing